Joseph Wilson Baines (January 24, 1846 – November 18, 1906) was Secretary of State of Texas and a member of the Texas state legislature.

Baines was born in Mount Lebanon, Louisiana, and his family moved to Anderson, Texas when he was four. He was a son of George Washington Baines. He studied at Baylor University. In 1867 he moved to Collin County, Texas, where he studied law under James W. Throckmorton. Baines was involved as owner and publisher of multiple papers in McKinney, Texas. From 1883–1887, Baines was the Secretary of State of Texas. Later, starting in 1903, he served one term in the Texas House of Representatives, being succeeded by his future son-in-law Samuel Ealy Johnson Jr.

Baines married Ruth Ament Huffman of Collin County in 1896. Both are buried at Der Stadt Friedhof in Fredericksburg, Texas. They were the parents of Rebekah Baines Johnson, and the maternal grandparents of Lyndon B. Johnson.

References

Sources
 Goodwin, Doris Kearns. Lyndon Johnson and the American Dream. New York: St. Martin's Press, 1991.

See also
 Family of Lyndon B. Johnson

External links
 

1846 births
1906 deaths
People from Bienville Parish, Louisiana
People from Fredericksburg, Texas
Baylor University alumni
Members of the Texas House of Representatives
Secretaries of State of Texas
Lyndon B. Johnson family
19th-century American politicians